Crawford State Park may refer to:

 Crawford State Park (Colorado)
 Crawford State Park (Kansas)
 Crawford State Park (Washington)